Désiré Ecaré (April 15, 1939 in Treichville, Côte d'Ivoire – February 16, 2009 in Abidjan, Côte d'Ivoire) was an Ivorian film director. He directed the seminal film Faces of Women in 1985, which went on to win the FIPRESCI Prize at Cannes Film Festival.

References

External links 

 Curry, Ginette. Awakening African Women: The Dynamics of Change. Cambridge Scholars Press, London. January 4, 2004. .

 

1939 births
2009 deaths
Ivorian film directors
People from Abidjan